The Workers and Peasants Party, also known as the Party of Workers and Farmers, is a socialist political party in Egypt.

In September 2012, it became part of the Democratic Revolutionary Coalition.

References

Political parties in Egypt
Political parties with year of establishment missing
Socialist parties in Egypt